Elections were held in Florida on Tuesday, November 2, 2010. Primary elections were held on August 24, 2010.

Florida had 4.6 million Democrats and 4 million Republicans. The latter outpolled Democrats among the 2.4 million independent voters and attracted conservative Democrats in cross-party voting. While running behind Republicans generally, the Democrats ran strongly in every urban area of the state. They lost by lopsided margins in the far Panhandle, Southwest Florida and the Space Coast.

Federal

United States Senate 

Main contenders for Florida's open Senate seat include Republican Marco Rubio, Democrat Kendrick Meek, and independent Charlie Crist, along with many other third-party and independent candidates.

United States House 

All twenty-five of Florida's seats in the United States House of Representatives are up for election in 2010.

State

Governor and Lieutenant Governor

Incumbent governor Charlie Crist did not run for re-election, choosing instead to run for election as senator (initially as a Republican, then later as an independent).  In Florida, the governor and lieutenant governor run as a ticket.

Republican Rick Scott and Democrat Alex Sink won their respective party's primaries; Scott named Jennifer Carroll as his lieutenant-governor running mate while Sink named Rod Smith.

Scott would go on to win the general election by plurality, thus holding the seat for the GOP.

State Senate
Approximately one-half of the forty seats of the Florida Senate were up for election in 2010.

State House of Representatives
All 120 seats in the Florida House of Representatives are up for election in 2010.

Attorney General
Republican Pam Bondi, Democrat Dan Gelber and independent Jim Lewis ran for Florida Attorney General, with Bondi winning the election.

Other state offices
The other state-level offices within the Florida Cabinet up for election were the chief financial officer and the commissioner of agriculture and consumer services.  The Republican candidates (Jeff Atwater and Adam Putnam, respectively) won their elections.

Judicial positions
Multiple judicial positions will be up for election in 2010, including four justices of the Supreme Court of Florida.
Florida judicial elections, 2010 at Judgepedia

Ballot measures
Seven measures have been certified for the 2010 ballot.
Florida 2010 ballot measures at Ballotpedia

Local
Many elections for county offices were also held on November 2, 2010.

Notes

External links
Elections Division of the Florida Secretary of State
Florida Candidate List at Imagine Election – Search for candidates by zip code
Candidates for Florida State Offices at Project Vote Smart
Florida Congressional Races in 2010 for campaign finance data for federal races from OpenSecrets
Florida State Races in 2010 campaign finance data for state races from Follow the Money

 
Florida